Inna Suprun (born 10 April 1983) is a Ukrainian World Cup level biathlete.

Performances

World Cup

Positions

External links
 Biathlon.com.ua
 IBU.com
 IBU Datacenter

1983 births
Living people
People from Konotop
S
Sportspeople from Sumy Oblast